Gino Corradini (born 20 April 1941) is a retired Italian weightlifter. He competed at the 1968 Summer Olympics in the light-heavyweight class and finished in 12th place.

References

1941 births
Living people
Olympic weightlifters of Italy
Weightlifters at the 1968 Summer Olympics
Italian male weightlifters
Sportspeople from Bolzano
20th-century Italian people